Coldwater Lake is a barrier lake on the border of Cowlitz County and Skamania County, Washington in the United States. The lake was created during the 1980 eruption of Mount St. Helens, which blocked its natural outlet, Coldwater Creek, with volcanic debris. It is one of several lakes in the area that were created or otherwise enlarged by the eruption.

Geography
The lake runs from northeast to southwest, with the west end in Cowlitz County and the east end in Skamania County. The portion of the lake in Skamania County is part of Gifford Pinchot National Forest. Coldwater Creek drains the lake on its southwest end and flows into the North Fork of the Toutle River, a tributary of the Cowlitz River, in turn a tributary of the Columbia River.

Coldwater is a ribbon lake, occupying the trough of a glacial valley. The length of the lake is about  while the maximum width is no more than half a mile (0.8 km). Coldwater Creek drains  or 33% of the total, South Fork Coldwater Creek drains  or 38%, and another  or 30% drains directly into the lake. Several smaller lakes or glacial tarns are part of the watershed; the named ones are Heart Lake and Snow Lake, which both flow into Coldwater Creek before entering Coldwater Lake.

History
Over the next few months, almost  of water collected to form a lake  in length. At the rate the lake was filling, it was anticipated to overtop the landslide dam by late 1981 or 1982. Because the material forming the dam consisted of soft volcanic debris and ash, it would erode quickly if overtopped, causing serious flooding downstream.

In May 1985 a tunnel was excavated to connect Spirit Lake to South Coldwater Creek. The eruption had blocked the outlet of Spirit Lake causing it to rise to dangerous levels. The tunnel allowed excess water from Spirit Lake to drain into Coldwater Lake, and from there into the Toutle River. The landslide dam forming Coldwater Lake was closely monitored until 1998, when its stability was no longer deemed a serious concern.

The lake has since been shrinking slowly due to erosion of the approximately  watershed, which was largely stripped of vegetation during the 1980 eruption. However, the area has recovered significantly in the intervening decades with second-growth forest returning. Several deltas have formed around the lake, the largest formed at South Coldwater Creek, whose valley sits closest to the blast zone.

Recreation
The lake is now part of Mount St. Helens National Volcanic Monument, designated in 1982. Washington State Route 504 (the Spirit Lake Highway) provides access from Interstate 5 at Castle Rock. Coldwater Ridge Visitor Center, located on the cliffs west of the lake, provides a panoramic view of the valley; on weekends a Science and Learning Center is open to the public here. The Coldwater Lake Recreation Area, located on the south end of the lake, is available for day use only as the area is located within the restricted zone of the National Monument. The recreation area includes a picnic area, restrooms and boat ramp (non-motorized watercraft only). The  Birth of a Lake Trail is a boardwalk trail accessible from the recreation area, and includes interpretive displays discussing the formation of the lake by the eruption. The Lakes Trail runs along the western shore and allows access to the Mount Margaret Backcountry beyond the lake.

The lake has had resident rainbow trout and cutthroat trout since the Washington State Department of Fish and Wildlife (DFW) stocked it in the 1980s. Pre-1980 fish populations in Coldwater Creek and the Toutle River were wiped out by the eruption of Mount St. Helens. The DFW no longer stocks the lake but continues to manage it as a trout fishery. The daily catch limit is one fish, minimum length .

See also
Toutle River Sediment Retention Structure
Volcanic dam

References

External links
Coldwater Lake at Lakelubbers
Area trail map from USFS

Lakes of Washington (state)
Landslide-dammed lakes
Lakes of Skamania County, Washington
Lakes of Cowlitz County, Washington